The Consensus 1997 College Basketball All-American team, as determined by aggregating the results of three major All-American teams.  To earn "consensus" status, a player must win honors from a majority of the following teams: the Associated Press, the USBWA and the National Association of Basketball Coaches.

1997 Consensus All-America team

Individual All-America teams

AP Honorable Mention:

Danya Abrams, Boston College
Toby Bailey, UCLA
Tony Battie, Texas Tech
Cory Carr, Texas Tech
Anthony Carter, Hawaii
Antonio Daniels, Bowling Green
Larry Davis, South Carolina
Thaddeus Delaney, College of Charleston
Michael Dickerson, Arizona
Reggie Freeman, Texas
Kiwane Garris, Illinois
Pat Garrity, Notre Dame
Matt Harpring, Georgia Tech
Odell Hodge, Old Dominion
Jerald Honeycutt, Tulane
Marc Jackson, Temple
Sam Jacobson, Minnesota
DeMarco Johnson, Charlotte
Charles Jones, Long Island
Trajan Langdon, Duke
BJ McKie, South Carolina
Charles O'Bannon, UCLA
Victor Page, Georgetown
Anthony Parker, Bradley
Paul Pierce, Kansas
Scot Pollard, Kansas
Charles Smith, New Mexico
Olivier Saint-Jean, San Jose State
Kenny Thomas, New Mexico
Tim Thomas, Villanova
Melvin Watson, South Carolina
DeJuan Wheat, Louisville
Alvin Williams, Villanova
Dedric Willoughby, Iowa State

References

NCAA Men's Basketball All-Americans
All-Americans